"Don't Be My Enemy" is a single by English new wave band Wang Chung. It was the first single from their studio album Points on the Curve (1983) in the UK, where it reached No. 92 on July 16, 1983.  In the US, it was released as the third single from the album, and reached No. 86 on the US Billboard Hot 100 in September 1984.

Music video
The music video was directed by Dan Kleinman in 1984 and revolves around a female stage magician (portrayed by Susan Olar) who uses the band, performing the song, as subjects for her magic tricks, disappearing them or sawing them in half. In an attempt to defend himself, Jack Hues violently shakes the woman, but finds himself tricked into wrestling a mannequin. As the band performs the end of the song, the woman prepares to deal another blow, but notices the viewer and redirects her attack, ending the video.

Track listing
 "Don't Be My Enemy"
 "The Waves" (Instrumental)

Charts

References

External links

1984 singles
Wang Chung (band) songs
Songs written by Jack Hues
Songs written by Nick Feldman
Song recordings produced by Ross Cullum
Song recordings produced by Chris Hughes (record producer)
1983 songs
Geffen Records singles